The grey-eyed greenlet (Hylophilus amaurocephalus) is a species of bird in the family Vireonidae.
It is found in Bolivia and Brazil.
Its natural habitats are subtropical or tropical dry forests, subtropical or tropical moist lowland forests, subtropical or tropical dry shrubland, and heavily degraded former forest.

References

grey-eyed greenlet
Birds of the Cerrado
grey-eyed greenlet
grey-eyed greenlet
Taxonomy articles created by Polbot